The American Diabetes Association (ADA) is a United States-based nonprofit that seeks to educate the public about diabetes and to help those affected by it through funding research to manage, cure and prevent diabetes (including type 1 diabetes, type 2 diabetes, gestational diabetes, and pre-diabetes). It is a network of 565,000 volunteers which includes 20,000 healthcare professionals and administration staff members.

Historical background 
The ADA was formerly founded in 1939. It was founded by six physicians − including Dr. Herman O. Mosenthal, Dr. Joseph T. Beardwood Jr., Dr. Joseph H. Barach, and Dr. E. S. Dillion − at their annual meeting of the American College of Physicians.

Each year the ADA hosts Scientific Sessions, a meeting for diabetes professionals.  The ADA has nearly 20,000 members.

In the early 2000s, the ADA struck a three-year, $1.5 million sponsorship deal with Cadbury-Schweppes, the world's largest confectioner products including Diet-Rite sodas, Snapple unsweetened tea and Mott's Apple Sauce.

According to a 2006 New York Times article, "critics say the A.D.A. affiliation has helped the candy maker pose as a concerned corporate citizen, even as it supplies grocery stores with sugary and fattening foods like Dr Pepper and the Cadbury Creme Egg." The article goes on to say, "The A.D.A. began rethinking how it raises money from companies, especially from those whose primary business is selling foods and beverages that are high in calories, even if they have created some sugar free items. The group has allowed some food company deals to expire and has turned down millions of dollars in new sponsorships."

Accountability 
The organization spends significant amounts on telemarketers including a contract with InfoCision, where telemarketers were instructed to lie to prospective donors that more of their donation was going toward the ADA than reality.

The most highest compensated 20 individuals of the ADA received $5.3 million (an average of $266,000 each).

The Charity Navigator gave the ADA a 2-star overall rating, a 1-star financial rating and a 4-star accountability and transparency rating.

Funded research 
The ADA aims to give individuals with diabetes access to the care they need to optimize their health. To work towards achieving this mission, the organization places effort into funding research projects that help minority groups navigate diabetes. The ADA works with various colleges, local governments, and companies to promote healthy lifestyles. They also fund research looking to control risk factors associated with diabetes, as seen in a recently published article discussing the role of microglia immune cells in diet-induced obesity. 96% of ADA funded researchers remain dedicated to careers in diabetes science, every $1 the ADA invests in diabetes research leads to $12.47 in additional research funding.

See also 
 Diabetes UK
 Diabetes Australia-NSW
 Centers for Disease Control
 National Diabetes Education Program
 NIDDK
 Tracey D. Brown

Notes

External links 
 Official website

Diabetes organizations
Health and disability rights organizations in the United States
Organizations based in Alexandria, Virginia
Organizations established in 1940